D. R. Rajaram Naidu is an Indian politician and former Member of the Legislative Assembly of Tamil Nadu. He was elected to the Tamil Nadu legislative assembly from Thalli constituency as an Indian National Congress candidate in 1977 election, and as an Indian National Congress (Indira) candidate in 1980 election.He was also the candidate for parliament elections nd won it successfully.

References 

3.  IN 2000 HE CONTESTED FOR MP SEAT AT KRISHNAGIRI AS TAMIL MANILA CONGRESS MEMBER AND LOST THAT ELECTION .

Members of the Tamil Nadu Legislative Assembly
Indian National Congress politicians from Tamil Nadu
Living people
Year of birth missing (living people)